Karol Borhy (23 June 1912 in Budapest – 9 January 1997 in Lučenec) was a Czechoslovak football coach. He coached FK Inter Bratislava, ŠK Slovan Bratislava and briefly Czechoslovakia national football team. Borhy was a member of the Hungarian minority in Slovakia.

Borhy also coached Jednota Trenčín for many years in the 1960s and 1970s. He also worked for six years in Kuwait.

References 

1912 births
1997 deaths
ŠK Slovan Bratislava managers
Slovak football managers
Czechoslovak football managers
FK Inter Bratislava managers
Czechoslovakia national football team managers
1954 FIFA World Cup managers
AS Trenčín managers
Sportspeople from Budapest
Hungarians in Slovakia